Turkish Airlines Flight 345 was a scheduled domestic passenger flight operated by a Fokker F28-1000 Fellowship from Izmir Cumaovası Airport to Istanbul Yeşilköy Airport that crashed into the Sea of Marmara on 30 January 1975 during approach. It was the second worst accident involving a Fokker F28 and third deadliest aviation accident in Turkey at that time.

Background
The aircraft operating Flight 345 was a Fokker F28-1000 Fellowship with manufacturer serial number 11058, and made its first flight in 1972. Since then, it had accumulated 3713 flying hours in 5062 flight cycles. Flight 345 took off from Izmir Cumaovası Airport at around 18:00 EET (20:00 UTC) for a 40-minute flight to Istanbul Yeşilköy Airport with 38 passengers and 4 crew members on board.

Accident
At 18:39, the aircraft touched down on the runway at Istanbul Yeşilköy Airport, but an electrical power failure at the airport at that very moment forced the crew to initiate a missed approach. Twenty-two seconds after the lights went off, the emergency generator jumped in and restored the runway lights. At 18:43, the crew asked for permission to land while positioning for another approach. However, because another aircraft was about to take off, air traffic control ordered the crew of Flight 345 to fly an extended downwind leg. When, at 18:53, air traffic control attempted to establish contact with Flight 345, it received no answer.

It was determined that the aircraft crashed into the Sea of Marmara. However, the wreckage was not located until several years later.

Recovery
The relatives of the victims continuously demanded, without success, the recovery of the wreckage and the bodies of the victims from the sea floor. A  by   portion from the rear fuselage with five window frames was recovered on March 17, 2009, by shrimp trawling fishermen off the Avcılar-Florya coast. The wreckage was handed over to Turkish Airlines after inspection by Stuart Kline, an American historian of aviation living in Turkey.

References

Aviation accidents and incidents in 1975
Aviation accidents and incidents in Turkey
1975 in Turkey
345
Accidents and incidents involving the Fokker F28
Airliner accidents and incidents with an unknown cause
1970s in Istanbul
Istanbul Atatürk Airport
January 1975 events in Europe